Sierra Morena (English translation: Brown Mountain Range) is a Cuban village and consejo popular (people's council) of the municipality of Corralillo, Villa Clara Province.

See also
Rancho Veloz

References

Populated places in Villa Clara Province